André Luiz Inácio da Silva (born 23 February 2002), commonly known as just André or André Luiz, is a Brazilian professional footballer who plays as a forward for Campeonato Brasileiro Série A club Flamengo.

Club career
Born in Rio de Janeiro, André Luiz began his career with Flamengo and made his professional debut for the club on 9 December 2021 in a Campeonato Brasileiro Série A match against Atlético Goianiense.

Career statistics

References

External links

2002 births
Living people
Association football forwards
Campeonato Brasileiro Série A players
CR Flamengo footballers
Footballers from Rio de Janeiro (city)
Brazilian footballers